Club Baloncesto Morón, also known as Aceitunas Fragata Morón as sponsorship, is a Spanish professional basketball team based in Morón de la Frontera, Andalusia.

History
The club was founded on 1 February 1993 with the aim to replace former CD Arunci, that was dissolved.

In July 2015 the club was promoted to LEB Plata after winning the three games of one of the Final Stages of the 2014–15 Liga EBA.

Season by season

Notable players 
 To appear in this section a player must have either:
- Set a club record or won an individual award as a professional player.
- Played at least one official international match for his senior national team at any time.
  J.R. Cadot
  Brandon Sebirumbi

Notes

References

External links 
 CB Morón Official Website

Moron
LEB Plata teams
Former Liga EBA teams
Basketball teams established in 1993
1993 establishments in Spain
Province of Seville